Leo Menardi (1903–1954) was an Italian screenwriter, producer and film director. He also worked as editor and assistant director on The Song of Love (1930), the first Italian sound film. In 1942 he wrote and directed Luisa Sanfelice.

Selected filmography
 The Song of Love (1930)
 The Devil's Lantern (1931)
 One Night with You (1932)
 The Haller Case (1933)
 Unripe Fruit (1934)
 Luisa Sanfelice (1942)
 Annabella's Adventure (1943)

References

Bibliography 
 Marrone, Gaetana & Puppa, Paolo. Encyclopedia of Italian Literary Studies. Routledge, 2006.

External links 
 

1903 births
1954 deaths
20th-century Italian screenwriters
Italian male screenwriters
Italian film directors
Film people from Turin
20th-century Italian male writers